Letterio Catapano was an Italian footballer. He was one of the S.S.C. Napoli's first players.

After spells with A.S. Taranto Calcio, he made the move to S.S.C. Napoli in 1926, where he played three seasons in the Divisione Nazionale. He made his debut in the club's first ever competitive fixture, a 3–0 defeat at home to Inter Milan on 3 October 1926. He continued to play all eighteen games of the season, all but one of which ended in defeat. In 1927-28, Catapano played in the 4–0 win over Reggiana on 25 September 1927, the club's first ever top-flight victory. He made just two appearances in his final season with the club, and moved on to Paganese Calcio 1926 in 1929 and to F.C. Catanzaro in 1930. He finished his career at Ascoli Calcio 1898, retiring in 1933.

See also
Football in Italy
List of football clubs in Italy

References

Italian footballers
Association football midfielders
Taranto F.C. 1927 players
Paganese Calcio 1926 players
S.S.C. Napoli players
U.S. Catanzaro 1929 players
Ascoli Calcio 1898 F.C. players
Year of birth missing